Bow High School is a four-year public high school in Bow, New Hampshire, United States, and is part of the Bow School District. The principal is Brian O'Connell and the vice principal is Matt Fisk.

As of the 2021-2022 school year, the school had an enrollment of 621 students and 49.40 classroom teachers (on an FTE basis), for a student-teacher ratio of 12.57.

History 
Bow High School was established in 1997, serving grades 9 through 12. Before this time high school students from Bow went to Concord. In 1993 the Concord School District told Bow they could no longer send Bow students to Concord High after the 1996-1997 school year. Immediately Bow started to make plans for a high school of their own. The school was built and now sits on the shores of Turee Pond. The school was originally designed to accommodate 600 students, and in the 2021-2022 school year had a student population of 621. The school cost $16 million. Beginning in the fall of 2014, the school began serving students from the neighboring town of Dunbarton.

The school has a 595-seat auditorium, an 800-seat gym, rock climbing wall, and state of the art technology.

Academics

Classes 
Each student at BHS is required to take two science classes, which is fulfilled through a mandatory Integrated Science and Technology class freshman and sophomore year,  although the majority of students take more than that. Students are required to graduate with two and a half Building Essential Skills for Tomorrow (B.E.S.T) classes (physical education). Students are also required to take a freshmen Humanities class, a sophomore American studies class, a junior World Studies class, and seniors are required to take Senior Seminar, a class that directs them through their senior project. The school offers many different elective classes, such as art, music, STEM, and physical education.

Recently, Bow High School revamped its schedule adding in a 40 minute study period called "flex time." The start time of the school day has been pushed back on certain days of the week as well.

Graduation credit requirements 
Bow High School requires students to acquire 24 academic credits to graduate.

Non-Credit Requirements:
 Minimum of 20 community service Community Service hours.
 Minimum of 20 Career Exploration hours.
 Senior Project (as part of the Senior Seminar course)
 Digital Portfolio

Athletics 
Mike Desilets is Bow School District's Athletic Administrator. As of 2022, Bow has won 82 state championships.

The athletic teams participate primarily in NHIAA Division 2 with some teams participating in Division 1 and 3.

Extracurricular activities
Bow High School offers an extensive and diverse list of student and staff ran clubs in addition to their Athletic Programs. Clubs range from service based clubs such as Interact, Peer Outreach, and NHS, to Language, Arts, STEM, and Special Interests Clubs. 

Student Teal Van Dyck won second place in the national Poetry Out Loud in 2006, earning a $10,000 scholarship. Van Dyck was also selected to be one of Bow High School's Granite State Challenge competitors on New Hampshire's PBS station, NHPTV.

The school was the scene of a set piece speech by Bill Clinton on January 8, 2008 in support of Hillary Clinton's 2008 presidential campaign.

Controversies
In 2005 there was controversy when the Bow High School administration told a student, Isabel Gottlieb, that she would not graduate for not satisfying the state's physical education requirement. The student did not want to take the minimum state requirements of Physical Education, and opted for study hall instead.  The situation was resolved when her previous high school issued her a new transcript, awarding her credit for participation in varsity athletics.

In June 2005 the student population, with the exception of the senior class, took place in a school mandated DHHS survey.  17% of surveyed students reported smoking marijuana during a 30-day period and 31% reported consuming alcohol during the same period.  The results were below the state average for student substance abuse and the school principal did not consider the results sufficient to necessitate drug testing of student athletes.

References

External links
 Official site

Educational institutions established in 1997
Schools in Merrimack County, New Hampshire
Public high schools in New Hampshire
Bow, New Hampshire
1997 establishments in New Hampshire